The Front of the Greek Anticapitalist Left (ANT.AR.SY.A, literally "Anticapitalist Left Cooperation for the Overthrow") is a coalition of radical left political organisations in Greece. The Greek word ανταρσία antarsia (which is pronounced the same as the backronym Antarsya) means "mutiny". ANTARSYA describes itself as "Front of the anticapitalist, revolutionary, communist left and radical ecology".

ANTARSYA was founded on 22 March 2009 in Athens by 10 organisations and independent militants involved in the Radical Left Front (MERA) and United Anti-Capitalist Left (ENANTIA) with the exception of the Workers Revolutionary Party (ΕΕΚ). These organisations come from different left wing currents ranging from ex-KKE and KKE Interior members to Maoism and Trotskyism.

Members
The 6 organisations which are members of ANTARSYA:
Alternative Ecologists
New Left Current (NAR)
Organization of Communist Internationalists of Greece–Spartacus, Greek section of the Fourth International (OKDE-Spartakos)
Revolutionary Communist Movement of Greece (EKKE)
Socialist Workers' Party (SEK)
Youth of Communist Liberation (nΚΑ)

The Organisation of Internationalist Communists of Greece, although it participated in the foundation of ANTARSYA, left the coalition shortly afterwards on 18 May 2009.

ANTARSYA is based on local assemblies of militants at city or neighbourhood-level with a central coordination committee in Athens. There are also periodically national assemblies of ANTARSYA.

Left Recomposition (ARAN) and Left Anti-capitalist Group (ARAS) were part of the coalition till August 2015.Left Group (ARIS) also left in July of 2022.

Ideology
ANTARSYA calls for exiting the European Union and dropping the euro currency, defaulting on Greece's debt, and nationalization without compensation of major industries. The party also calls for a banning of lay-offs, a minimum salary of equivalent to 1,400 euros, a reduction of weekly working time to 35 hours without reduction of wages, the disarmament of the police, full political and social rights for immigrants, and an ecosocialist answer to ecological crisis.

Popular support and electoral results
ANTARSYA participated for the first time in elections in the European Parliament elections in June 2009. It took 21,951 votes or 0.43% of the votes. ANTARSYA also participated in the October 4, 2009 general elections presenting lists in every constituency. The party secured 24,737 votes, or 0.36% of those cast.

It contested the September 2015 Greek legislative election in a joint campaign with the Workers Revolutionary Party (EEK).

Regional elections

Hellenic Parliament

1 Participated in coalition with the Left Front Coalition (MARS)
2 Participated in coalition with the Workers Revolutionary Party (EEK)

European Parliament

See also
Politics of Greece
List of political parties in Greece
List of communist parties

Notes

External links
Antarsya website

2009 establishments in Greece
Anti-capitalist political parties
Communist parties in Greece
Ecosocialist parties
Eurosceptic parties in Greece
Far-left politics in Greece
Left-wing political party alliances
Political parties established in 2009
Political party alliances in Greece
Greece
Left-wing politics in Greece
Socialist parties in Greece
Trotskyist organizations in Greece